Marion Laboure is an economist, macro strategist and a lecturer. She currently works as a Macro strategist at Deutsche Bank, London. She is also a lecturer at Harvard University in Economics and Finance.

Early life and education
Marion Laboure completed her bachelor’s degree in mathematics, economics, and finance from the University of Paris Dauphine. She further completed her Master’s in economics from The London School of Economics and Political Science. She earned her Ph.D. in the field of Econometrics and Quantitative Economics from the Ecole Normale Superieure.

Career
After completing her master's degree from the London School of Economics, Laboure started her career at the Bureau of European Policy Advisers, which works as an advisor to the President of the European Commission.

She joined Barclays investment bank as an economist in 2010. In 2012 she joined the Central bank of Luxembourg as an economist. After completing her PhD, she joined Harvard University as a lecturer in finance and economics. During this time, she received first prize from the American Society of Actuaries, Revue Banque nominated her as a rising star in finance, she is part of the 45 standout women in fintech, and Business Insider named her a cryptocurrency mastermind.

Books

Personal life
Laboure has studied music theory and piano for 12 years at the Conservatory. She received the 2nd prize of the National competition.

References

Living people
French women economists
21st-century French economists
Deutsche Bank people
Harvard University faculty
Harvard Extension School faculty
Paris Dauphine University alumni
Alumni of the London School of Economics
École Normale Supérieure alumni
Presidential advisors
Barclays people
People associated with cryptocurrency
21st-century French women pianists
Year of birth missing (living people)